Romain Jules Salin (born 29 July 1984) is a French professional footballer who plays as a goalkeeper for Stade Rennais F.C.

He spent most of his professional career in Portugal's Primeira Liga, making 140 appearances for Naval, Marítimo, Rio Ave and Sporting CP, winning a Taça de Portugal and two Taça da Liga titles with the last of those clubs.

Club career
Born in Mayenne, Pays de la Loire, Salin spent six of his first seven seasons as a senior in Ligue 2, in representation of Stade Lavallois, FC Lorient, FC Libourne and Tours FC. In 2007–08 he was part of the second club's Ligue 1 squad, but failed to make any competitive appearances.

In the 2010 off-season, Salin moved to Portugal where he would remain the following six years, signing with Associação Naval 1º de Maio who was coached by compatriot Victor Zvunka. He made his Primeira Liga debut on 14 August, in a 1–0 away loss against FC Porto.

After his team's relegation, Salin went on to appear for fellow league sides C.S. Marítimo (two spells) and Rio Ave FC. He played ten games for the former in the 2012–13 edition of the UEFA Europa League, which ended in group-stage elimination.

In the summer of 2016, Salin returned to his homeland and joined En Avant Guingamp on a one-year contract. His maiden appearance in the French top division occurred on 21 September at the age of 32, in a 1–0 home win over Lorient.

On 29 July 2017, Salin agreed to a two-year deal at Sporting CP, replacing the departed Beto as backup to Rui Patrício. His debut on 19 September was a goalless draw at home to his former club Marítimo, in the group stage of his team's eventual conquest of the Taça da Liga. He began his second season as first choice after the departure of Patrício, but following injury against Portimonense S.C. in October 2018 he was surpassed by loanee Renan Ribeiro. The club completed a domestic cup double, with him playing all three league cup group games, and the 2–0 win at C.D. Feirense in the quarter-finals of the Taça de Portugal on 16 January 2019.

Salin went back to his country's top flight in June 2019, signing for Stade Rennais F.C. for two years. In December 2020, having made seven appearances that season, he added another year to his contract; he subsequently tied himself to the Roazhon Park club until 2024.

Honours
Sporting CP
Taça de Portugal: 2018–19
Taça da Liga: 2017–18, 2018–19

References

External links

1984 births
Living people
Sportspeople from Mayenne
French footballers
Footballers from Pays de la Loire
Association football goalkeepers
Ligue 1 players
Ligue 2 players
Stade Lavallois players
FC Lorient players
FC Libourne players
Tours FC players
En Avant Guingamp players
Stade Rennais F.C. players
Primeira Liga players
Associação Naval 1º de Maio players
C.S. Marítimo players
Rio Ave F.C. players
Sporting CP footballers
French expatriate footballers
Expatriate footballers in Portugal
French expatriate sportspeople in Portugal